Mozhgan Rahmani (born December 31, 1989) is an Iranian Darts player. Since 2017, she has been a member of the Iranian National Darts Team. She is the first Iranian in Iran's Darts history to be inducted into Professional Darts Corporation.
She is an Iranian legionary in Malaysia's DURY team. The only Iranian athlete interviewed by Sky Sports and RTL.

Career 
She was runner up of IRIDA 2016 just 5 months after she started playing darts professionally in 2016. Five months later, she earned runner up of world's ranking in Shiraz Open 2016. In 2017 she became a member of Iran's darts national team and reached 28th place in the world ranking by winning the Shiraz open and Malaysia open. She is the only Iranian who has played in the world PDC competitions.

Achievements

International 

 In 2016, For the first time, Mozhan reached the championship stage of competition and won the runner up. She got 63 points in world's ranking (world ranking of 117).
 In 2017, She participated in Shiraz Open and Malaysian Open. She won both of those competitions earning 90 pts in Shiraz and 90v pts in Malaysia, reaching world rank of 28.
 In the 2018 Mediterranean open, she and her team won the competition by beating Turkey in the finals.
 In the 2018 Malaysia open she reached top 32 in individual and top 8 in doubles.
 In 2019, Selangor open (SO10), in individual play, she reached the top 8 and she got 22 world ranking points. In the threesome she and her team came Runner's up.
 In 2019, Mozhgan participated in PDC Asian Tour Stage 5 and 6 in Tacloban, Philippines, representing her country for the first time in PDC. In Philippines Open 2019, she reached top 16.
 She participated at the Bengal Rowing Club (BRC) tournament in India in 5 sections. In Women's Singles, she won the gold medal losing only 1 leg and winning all of her matches with a 3-0 result. In Mixed Doubles, she partnered with Nitin Kumar (PDC World Championship 2018 player) and they won the first place by defeating an Australian team with 3-0 result. In Threesome, she won the runner up and in open doubles, she reached top 8 with her teammate "Asha", an Indian player. In the Team Event, her team reached the top 8. She was announced as the Player of the Tournament.
 In 2019, Mozhgan participated in PDC Asian Tour Stage 11 and 12 in Singapore, the only representing her country in PDC.also the only woman from Asia in Stage 11 PDC Asian Tour
Malaysia Open 2019, ladies champion. 
She participated at the Dutch Open 2020 in Assen. In the couple tournament on Friday Januari 31st she played with the Polish Monika van Malsen - Bakalarcyk. They reached last 32 and lost from Winstanley Sutton. On Saturday February first she played in the single tournament. She lost in the third round.
The only Iranian athlete interviewed by Sky Sports and RTL

National 

 Runner up of Iran, June 2016
 Champion of Iran, March 2017
 Champion of Iran, June 2017
 Champion of Iran, September 2017
 Champion of Iran, December 2017
 Champion of Iran (Prime league), January 2018
 Champion of Iran, March 2018
 Champion of Iran, June 2018
 Champion of Iran, September 2018
 Champion of Iran, March 2019
 Champion of Iran, June 2019

References

External links 
 

1989 births
Living people
Professional Darts Corporation associate players
Iranian darts players
Female darts players